Sidi Bou Rouis  is a town and commune in the Siliana Governorate, Tunisia.

See also
List of cities in Tunisia

References

Populated places in Tunisia
Communes of Tunisia